Nathaniel Wells (10 September 1779 – 13 May 1852) was a British land owner and magistrate of Afro-Caribbean descent. Born on a Saint Kitts plantation to a white father and black mother, Wells inherited his father's plantations. He was sent to Britain to complete his education, eventually becoming a magistrate after being called to the bar, and became the second individual of African descent to hold a commission in the British Armed Forces after John Perkins of the Royal Navy. He was also Britain's first black sheriff. Wells died in 1852, remaining wealthy despite his slaves having been emancipated 19 years earlier by law.

Early life
Nathaniel Wells was born on 10 September 1779 to William Wells and Juggy Wells. William Wells (1730-1794) was a Welshman who emigrated from a wealthy Cardiff family to Saint Kitts with his younger brother Nataniel (b.1732). He became a successful slave trader before becoming a plantation owner. His wife Elizabeth and their son and one daughter died and were buried in Basseterre and their surviving daughter Elizabeth married John Taylor of Nevis. Following his wife's death, William Wells began fathering children by his female slaves – at least six, all by different women. Although sexual liaison with slaves was a common practice at the time, Wells differed from the majority by looking after both the children and their mothers, giving them both their freedom and sums of money to live on—including Nathaniel's mother Juggy (d.1811), who became known as Joardine Wells following her manumission. William Wells died when Nathaniel was fifteen years old and left the bulk of his estate to him as his only son. This included around £120,000 and three sugar planatations.

Return to Wales
When Nathaniel was aged around ten, his father sent him to London to be educated, under the care of his uncle Nathaniel until the age of twenty one. On completing his education he stayed in Britain, becoming a respected landowner in Monmouthshire, Wales. Wells also became a magistrate during his time in Britain, being one of the few Black British members of the British legal system at the time.

Slave estates
Nathaniel managed his inherited sugar plantation estates like any absentee white owner. Wells had little control over the way the slaves he owned were treated, as the estates were leased out to local managers. The punishment of slaves by one of these managers was singled out for criticism by British abolitionists and became the subject of an abolitionist tract, although it would appear that this was with the tacit consent of Wells, who refrained from suppressing its publication through the courts. The crux of the issue concerned a punishment of a slave owned by Wells - there were only supposed to be 39 lashes administered in one sitting of punishment, while it was alleged that a manager gave a slave 39 lashes plus a "brining" – putting pepper water onto those lashes to make the slaves scream. 

Wells remained a plantation owner and slave owner until emancipation was enacted by law in St Kitts in 1833, and was compensated financially for his loss by the British government with the sum of £1,400 9s 7d for the ownership of eighty-six enslaved people on St Kitts.

Piercefield House and Monmouthshire
By 1801, Wells had property worth an estimated £200,000 and was married to Harriet Este (1780–1820), the only daughter of Charles Este, a former chaplain to King George II. They had ten children including author Nathaniel Armstrong Wells (1806–1846), and churchmen Charles Rush Wells (1807-1869) and John Tighe Wells (1808-1848).

In 1802, he bought Piercefield House, Chepstow from Colonel Mark Wood, after agreeing to buy it for £90,000 over dinner. Wells added to Piercefield until it reached almost 3,000 acres (12km²). He continued the tradition of allowing visitors access to the grounds of his estate, among them the landscape painter Joseph Farington, who having met him in 1803 noted in his diary: "Mr Wells is a West Indian of large fortune, a man of very gentlemanly manners, but so much a man of colour as to be little removed from a Negro".

Wells seems to have taken a full part in local society. In 1804 he was appointed a churchwarden of St Arvans Church near Piercefield, a position he held for 40 years. Together with the Duke of Beaufort he contributed to the upkeep of the church fabric, and St Arvan's distinctive octagonal tower (1820) was his gift. In 1806 he was appointed a Justice of the Peace, while in 1832 he was on the committee of the Chepstow Hunt.

Sheriff

On 24 January 1818 Wells became Britain's first Black sheriff when he was appointed sheriff of Monmouthshire by the Prince Regent, and a deputy lieutenant of the county.

Yeomanry commission
On 20 June 1820 Wells was commissioned as a lieutenant in the Chepstow Troop of the Yeomanry Cavalry of Gloucestershire and Monmouth. This makes Wells the second Black person to be commissioned into the Armed Forces of the Crown, and no more Black officers are known to have been commissioned until almost one hundred years later. Yeomanry commissions were signed by the Lord Lieutenant of the County, not by the King, as were regular army commissions, and those in the later Special Reserve as held by Walter Tull during the First World War. Wells' military service was not just an honorary role. As Lieutenant Wells, it is recorded that he took part in action against striking coal-miners and iron workers in South Wales in 1822. Jackson's Oxford Journal of 11 May 1822 reprinting an article from the Bristol Mercury recorded that: "It was then decided that a party of the cavalry, under the command of Lieutenant Wells, of Piercefield, should form a kind of advance guard, and should precede the main body by about a mile, to prevent the breaking up of the roads." However, the road ran along a steep-sided valley, and his party came under attack from the iron workers, who threw down large stones and rocks. Even with the arrival of the rest of the Yeomanry, and the reading of the Riot Act, the road could not be cleared, and was not until three hours later, with the arrival of the regular cavalry of the Royal Scots Greys behind the workers, that the road was cleared.  He resigned his commission on 7 August 1822.

Declining years
In 1850, with failing health, Wells sold Piercefield to John Russell (1788–1873). Wells had been married twice: his second wife, in 1823, was Esther Owen (1804–1871), daughter of John Owen (1766–1822). Her sister, Mary Frances Owen, was married to William Wilberforce (1798–1879), eldest son of William Wilberforce. In all, Wells had 22 children. Two of his sons became clergymen and the eldest, Nathaniel Armstrong Wells (1806–1846), an author, writing and illustrating an account of his travels through Spain. Esther Wells died in Brighton 1888, four of Wells' daughters moved to Brighton in 1888.

Wells died at 9 Park Street, Landsdown in Bath, Somerset, in 1852 at the age of 72, worth an estimated £100,000.

A memorial tablet can be seen at St Arvans Church, near Chepstow, Monmouthshire. Piercefield estate is now the home of Chepstow Racecourse, while the house is abandoned and derelict.

Esther Wells died in Brighton in 1871, having been recorded in the census of that year living with five of her daughters, Esther, Augusta, Catharine, Cecilia and Matilda Wells. Her daughters remained in the town during the late nineteenth and early twentieth century.

References
W. H. Wyndham-Quin, The Yeomanry Cavalry of Gloucestershire and Monmouth (1898), republished by Golden Valley in 2005,

External links
  Transcript of the will of Nathaniel's father, William Wells

1779 births
1852 deaths
Saint Kitts and Nevis businesspeople
West Indies merchants
19th-century Welsh businesspeople
People from Chepstow
Welsh people of Saint Kitts and Nevis descent
High Sheriffs of Monmouthshire
Saint Kitts and Nevis people of British descent
Black British businesspeople
British slave owners
Saint Kitts and Nevis emigrants to the United Kingdom